Loch of Toftingall is a loch located to the east of Mybster in Highland, Scotland.

References

Lochs of Highland (council area)
Caithness